Squire is an unincorporated community in McDowell County, West Virginia, United States. Squire has a post office with ZIP code 24884.

The community was named after A. C "Squire" Christian, a local law enforcement agent.

References

Unincorporated communities in McDowell County, West Virginia
Unincorporated communities in West Virginia
Coal towns in West Virginia